Maksim Gorkiy class is a class of Russian river passenger ships. It is named after the first ship in the class Maksim Gorkiy.

Four-deck cruise ships built in Austria, 1974.

River cruise ships of the Austrian project Q-040

Overview

See also
 List of river cruise ships
 Valerian Kuybyshev-class motorship
 Rossiya class (project 785) motorship
 Rossiya class (project 1877) motorship
 Anton Chekhov class motorship
 Vladimir Ilyich class motorship
 Rodina class motorship
 Baykal class motorship
 Dmitriy Furmanov class motorship
 Sergey Yesenin class motorship
 Oktyabrskaya Revolyutsiya class motorship
 Yerofey Khabarov class motorship
 Dunay class motorship

References

External links
 Тип Максим Горький, проект Q-040 
 Project Q-040

River cruise ships
Ships of Russia
Ships of the Soviet Union
Austria–Soviet Union relations
Maxim Gorky